The Massachusetts general election, 2010 was held on November 2, 2010 throughout Massachusetts. Primary elections took place on September 14, 2010.

Governor and Lieutenant Governor

Governor Deval Patrick and Lieutenant Governor Tim Murray sought re-election. Republicans nominated former Harvard Pilgrim Health Care CEO Charlie Baker for Governor and Senate Minority Leader Richard Tisei for Lieutenant Governor.
State Treasurer Tim Cahill left the Democratic Party in September 2009 ran as an independent candidate.

Patrick and Murray were re-elected to a second term in office.

Secretary of the Commonwealth
Democratic incumbent William F. Galvin sought re-election. Republicans nominated Woburn City Clerk William Campbell. Galvin was also challenged by independent candidate James D. Henderson.

General election
Galvin was re-elected to a fourth term in office with 64% of the vote.

Attorney General
Attorney General Martha Coakley sought re-election.

Republican primary
The Republicans did not formally endorse a candidate at their state convention. Nevertheless, two late entry candidates, Jim McKenna, and Guy Carbone entered the campaign as write-in candidates. James McKenna received 27,711 certified write-in votes, which was a United States and Massachusetts electoral record.

Results

General election
Coakley was re-elected.

Treasurer

Treasurer Tim Cahill retired to run for Governor as an independent.

Democratic primary
Former Democratic National Committee National Chairman Steve Grossman won the Democratic primary against Boston City Councilor Stephen J. Murphy, and was opposed by Republican State Representative Karyn Polito (of Shrewsbury) in the general election.

Results

General election

Auditor

Auditor Joe DeNucci retired.

Republican primary

Candidates
 Mary Z. Connaughton, former board member of the Massachusetts Turnpike Authority
 Kamal Jain, Libertarian nominee for Auditor in 2002

Results

Democratic primary

Candidates
 Suzanne Bump, former Secretary of Labor and Workforce Development
 Guy Glodis, Worcester County Sheriff
 Mike Lake

Results

General election
Nathanael Fortune, the Green-Rainbow Party nominee, also appeared on the November ballot.

United States Senate

Neither of Massachusetts's two seats in the United States Senate was up for election in the 2010 general election.  In January 2010, Republican Scott Brown won a special election to fill the seat of Ted Kennedy.

United States House of Representatives

All of Massachusetts's ten seats in the United States House of Representatives are up for election in 2010.  All of the incumbent Representatives are seeking re-election, with the exception of Bill Delahunt of District 10.  Massachusetts is expected to lose one congressional seat in the redistricting that will follow the 2010 census.

State Legislature

Massachusetts Senate

All 40 seats in the Massachusetts Senate were up for election in 2010.

Massachusetts House of Representatives

All 160 seats in the Massachusetts House of Representatives were up for election in 2010.

Ballot measures
There were three statewide ballot questions, all initiatives.  Question 1 passed, but Questions 2 and 3 failed.

Question 1 repealed the sales tax on alcohol. Question 2 would have repealed an affordable housing statute. Question 3 would have lowered the sales tax rate.

County
Counties in Massachusetts will elect County Commissioners, District Attorneys, and Sheriffs.

References

External links
Elections Division of the Massachusetts Secretary of State
 
Candidates for Massachusetts State Offices at Project Vote Smart
Massachusetts Polls at Pollster.com
Massachusetts Congressional Races in 2010 campaign finance data from OpenSecrets
Massachusetts  2010 campaign finance data from Follow the Money
Local politics at The Boston Herald

 
Massachusetts